Marshall Peak is a peak,  high, which is ice-covered except for its rocky northeast side, standing  northwest of the head of Palmer Inlet on the east coast of Palmer Land, Antarctica. This coast was first explored in 1940 by members of the United States Antarctic Service, but the peak was first charted by a joint party consisting of members of the Ronne Antarctic Research Expedition and the Falkland Islands Dependencies Survey (FIDS) in 1947. It was named by the FIDS for Norman B. Marshall, a zoologist at the FIDS Hope Bay base in 1945–46.

References

Mountains of Palmer Land